Football was inducted at the Youth Olympic Games at the inaugural edition in 2010 for both boys and girls.

From the 2018 edition in Buenos Aires, FIFA replaced football with futsal.

Football

Boys

Summaries

Team appearances

Girls

Summaries

Team appearances

Futsal

Boys

Results

Team appearances

Girls

Results

Team appearances

Medal table
As of the 2018 Summer Youth Olympics.

See also
 Football at the Summer Olympics

References

External links
 Men's Youth Olympic Football Tournament, FIFA.com 
 Girls' Youth Olympic Football Tournament, FIFA.com 
 Youth Olympic Games, OLYMPIC.org  

 
Youth Olympics
Sports at the Summer Youth Olympics
Olympics